The Jewish cemeteries of Vinius are the three Jewish cemeteries of the Lithuanian Jews living in what is today Vilnius, the capital of Lithuania, which was known to them for centuries as Vilna, the principal city of the Grand Duchy of Lithuania and the Pale of Settlement of the Russian Empire. Two of the cemeteries were destroyed by the Soviet regime and the third is still active.

The oldest and the largest Jewish cemetery was established in the 15th century in Šnipiškės suburb, now in Žirmūnai elderate, across the Neris River from the Gediminas Tower. In Vilna Jewish culture, the cemetery was known as Piramont. It was closed by the Tsarist authorities in 1831. It was destroyed by the Soviet authorities in 1949–50 during the construction of Žalgiris Stadium. The Vilnius Palace of Concerts and Sports (Lithuanian: Koncertų ir sporto rūmai) was built in 1971 right in the middle of the former cemetery. In 2005, apartment and office buildings were built at the site. The project was condemned by international Jewish organizations and resulted in a motion being passed in the U.S. House of Representatives in 2008, condemning Lithuania for its "failure to protect the historic Jewish cemetery in Vilnius." In August 2009, the Lithuanian government reached an agreement with Jewish organizations on the boundaries of the cemetery and granted it protected status. Buildings already on the site will not be demolished.

The second cemetery was located in Užupis. It was active from 1828 to 1943 or 1948. It was also destroyed by the Soviet authorities in the 1960s following the destruction of the Great Synagogue of Vilna. Tombstones from the two old cemeteries were used for staircases in various construction works around the city. Currently a memorial constructed of them marks the location of the former entrance to the cemetery. Moreover, there are plans to build a monument in place of the old cemetery in Užupis.

The new Jewish cemetery was opened in Šeškinė district near Sudervė Cemetery. Some graves of famous people, including that of the Vilna Gaon, were relocated to the new place from the old cemeteries before the destruction. Currently it has about 6,500 Jewish graves.

See also 
 List of cemeteries in Lithuania

References

External links
 
 
 
 
 

Vilnius
Jews and Judaism in Vilnius
Judaism in Vilnius
Cemeteries in Vilnius
Cemetery vandalism and desecration